Donald Ryder may refer to:

Donald J. Ryder, retired U.S. Army major general
Donald P. Ryder (1926–2021), American architect